XBoard is a graphical user interface chessboard for chess engines under the X Window System. It is developed and maintained as free software by the GNU project. WinBoard is a port of XBoard to run natively on Microsoft Windows.

Overview
Originally developed by Tim Mann as a front end for the GNU Chess engine, XBoard eventually came to be described as a graphical user interface for XBoard engines. It also acts as a client for Internet Chess Servers, and e-mail chess, and can allow the user to play through saved games.

XBoard/WinBoard remain updated, and the Chess Engine Communication Protocol has been extended to meet the needs of modern engines (which have features such as hash tables, multi-processing and end-game tables, which could not be controlled through the old protocol).

XBoard/WinBoard also fully support engines that play chess variants, such as Fairy-Max. This means the GUI is able to display a wide range of variants such as xiangqi (Chinese chess), shogi (Japanese chess), makruk (Thai chess), Crazyhouse, Capablanca Chess and many other Western variants on boards of various sizes. It offers a Westernized representation for these games, but the almost limitless configurability of XBoard/WinBoard also allows a high-quality representation of non-Western style games.

Another computer chess protocol is the Universal Chess Interface (UCI). XBoard/WinBoard supports this protocol (and its dialects USI and UCCI, which are in common use for shogi and Chinese chess) through adapter programs such as Polyglot and UCI2WB.

Since 2014 there exists a special version of XBoard that better integrates with Apple's OS X. It is distributed from WinBoard forum as an OS X App, including several engines (for chess and many chess variants), and adapters for running engines in non-natively supported protocols. It also contains supporting software for connecting with the popular Internet Chess Servers FICS and ICC for on-line play. XBoard OS X Apps that specifically configure XBoard for oriental-style shogi or xiangqi are also available.

WinBoard is a version of XBoard adapted to MS Windows, and is available in a similar package.

See also 

 GNOME Chess
 Chess engine
 Computer chess

References

External links

XBoard on GNU Savannah
FAQ for the use of Xboard and Winboard chess engines
Listing of Xboard and Winboard chess engines

Free chess software
Free educational software
Free software programmed in C
GNU Project software
Linux games
Shogi software